Gábor Balázs  is a Hungarian sprint canoer who has competed since 2007. He won a bronze medal in the C-4 1000 m event at the 2007 ICF Canoe Sprint World Championships in Duisburg.

References

Gabor Balazs is training kids at KSI, Central Sport School of Hungary nowadays.

Hungarian male canoeists
Living people
Year of birth missing (living people)
ICF Canoe Sprint World Championships medalists in Canadian
21st-century Hungarian people